Boston Mills may refer to:

Boston Mills, previously known as Boston, a community in Caledon, Ontario, Canada
Boston Mills/Brandywine Ski Resort, in Ohio, United States
Shedd, Oregon, United States, previously known as Boston Mills
Boston Flour Mill, in Shedd
Boston, Summit County, Ohio, historically known as Boston Mills
Boston Mills Historic District, in Ohio, United States